The 2018–19 Austrian Football Bundesliga was the 107th season of top-tier football in Austria. Red Bull Salzburg successfully defended last year's title.

Changes

Structural changes 
The league expanded from 10 to 12 teams. A new format was introduced this season, under which the league is split into a championship round and a relegation round after 22 matches.

Team changes 
Wacker Innsbruck were promoted as champions of the 2017–18 Austrian Football First League and TSV Hartberg were promoted as runners-up. No teams were relegated as St. Pölten won their relegation playoff match.

Teams

Stadia and locations

Regular season

League table

Results

Championship round 
The points obtained during the regular season were halved (and rounded down) before the start of the playoff. As a result, the teams started with the following points before the playoff: Red Bull Salzburg 27 points, LASK 23, Sturm Graz 15, Wolfsberger AC 15, Austria Wien 15 and St. Pölten 15. The points of Red Bull Salzburg and Sturm Graz were rounded down – in the event of any ties on points at the end of the playoffs, a half point will be added for these teams.

Relegation round 
The points obtained during the regular season were halved (and rounded down) before the start of the playoff. As a result, the teams started with the following points before the playoff: Mattersburg 14 points, Rapid Wien 13, Hartberg 13, Admira Wacker Mödling 10, Rheindorf Altach 9 and Wacker Innsbruck 8. The points of Mattersburg, Rapid Wien, Admira Wacker Mödling and Wacker Innsbruck were rounded down – in the event of any ties on points at the end of the playoffs, a half point will be added for these teams.

Europa League play-offs 
The winner and the runner-up of the relegation round played a one-legged play-off semi-final match against each other. The winner played a two-legged final against the fifth-placed team from the championship round to determine the third Europa League participant.

Semi-final

Final

Statistics

Top scorers

Awards

Annual awards

Team of the Year

See also
 2018–19 Austrian Football Second League
 2018–19 Austrian Cup

References

External links
  

Austrian Football Bundesliga seasons
Aus
1